The Dublin–Belfast corridor (population 3.3 million) is a term used to loosely describe a geographical area that encompasses Ireland's capital city, Dublin and Northern Ireland's capital city, Belfast. It also includes the smaller cities of Lisburn and Newry; major towns such as Drogheda and Dundalk; and the Dublin satellite suburb of Swords. The term has been used in papers regarding planning strategies in the area, with the aim of capitalising on the expanding economies of both cities. Since the implementation of Brexit, the corridor exists inside the European Union on its Irish side, and outside the European Union on its Northern Irish side, but there is no so-called "hard border" between the two states.

Economy
The main economic engines of the region are the Greater Dublin Area and the Belfast Metropolitan Area. Greater Dublin has a GDP of around €85 billion (2012) while Belfast Metropolitan Area has €30 bn (2013) giving a total regional GDP of €115 bn.

Infrastructure

The main route linking the two cities is along the  M1 and N1 in the Republic of Ireland and the A1 and M1 in Northern Ireland.

There is also the Enterprise train service connecting the two city regions.

There are three major airports: Dublin Airport (32.9 million passengers; 2018), Belfast International Airport (6.2 million passengers; 2019) and Belfast City Airport (2 million passengers; 2019) which together deal with over 40 million passengers each year.

For the two cities:
Dublin is served by the Dublin Suburban Rail network, Dublin Bus network, Luas tram network, Dublin Area Rapid Transit and the planned MetroLink.
Belfast is served by the Belfast Suburban Rail network, Metro (Belfast) bus service, the new Glider (Belfast) bus rapid transport system and some Ulsterbus services.

See also
Economy of Dublin
Economy of Belfast
Central belt Scotland (Glasgow-Edinburgh) (3.5m)
Øresund Region
Tricity Poland
List of European city regions

References

External links
Belfast GDP, Office for National Statistics
Dublin GDP, Dublin Chamber of Commerce
Irish Planning Institute – Dublin–Belfast corridor
2012 Dublin Regional GDP

Belfast
Dublin (city)
Geography of Ireland
Transport in Ireland
Transport in Northern Ireland
Transport corridors